Wurz (also Wurtz) is a German surname. Notable people with the surname include:

 Alexander Wurz (born 1974), Austrian racing driver
 Stefan Wurz (born 1964), German composer
 Bill Wurtz, American video creator and musician
 Charles-Adolphe Wurtz (1817–1884), French chemist
 Francis Wurtz (born 1948), French member of the European Parliament
 Johannes Wurtz (born 1992), German association footballer
 Robert Wurtz (born 1936), American neuroscientist
 Robert Wurtz (referee) (born 1941), French association football referee

Würtz (transliterated Wuertz) is the surname of:
 Rasmus Würtz (born 1983), Danish association footballer
 Michael Wuertz (born 1978), American baseball player
  (1927–1994), Hungarian graphic artist, illustrator and painter
  (1965), Hungarian concert pianist